The Seven Natural Wonders of Georgia are considered to be:

Amicalola Falls
Okefenokee Swamp
Providence Canyon
Radium Springs
Stone Mountain
Tallulah Gorge
Warm Springs

The first list of natural wonders was compiled by state librarian Ella May Thornton and published in the Atlanta Georgian magazine on December 26, 1926.  That first list included:
Amicalola Falls
Jekyll Island Forest
Marble vein in Longswamp Valley in Pickens County
Okefenokee Swamp
Stone Mountain
Tallulah Gorge
Warm Springs

References
Georgia Encyclopedia

 
Nature-related lists